Lala Shevket (sometimes transliterated as Lala Şövkat or Lala Shovkat; Лала Шевкет in Russian transliteration) (born 7 November 1951, Baku) is an Azerbaijani politician, the Leader of the National Unity Movement and Azerbaijan Liberal Party. She served as the Secretary of State between 1993 and 1994.

Early life and scientific career 
Shevket was born on 7 November 1951 in Soviet Baku. Shevket's father, Shevket bey Muslim bey oqlu Khalifabeyli-Hajiyev was born 1912 in Quba region of Azerbaijan into a family of noble landowner and philanthropist Muslim bey Khalifabeyli. His mother Tughiya Khanum was the descendant of Shamil, 3rd Imam of Dagestan. In 1968, she graduated from the 189th secondary school of Baku and entered the Azerbaijan Medical University, where she received qualification of a professional physician. After graduation, she moved to Moscow where she had her post graduation and master course on the surgery chair of Patrice Lumumba Peoples' Friendship University under the guidance of academician, professor Vladimir Vladimirovich Vinogradov (:ru:Виноградов, Владимир Владимирович). At 25, she became the youngest Master of Science in area of surgery in the USSR. Since 1978, Shevket had been working at N. Sklifosovsky Moscow Scientific-Research Institute of First-Aid. Shevket traveled a long road from a junior research officer to a leading scientific specialist and the head of the department. In 1991, Shevket was officially enlisted by the Russian Prime Minister Ivan Silayev to work out the concepts of social policy of the country.

Shevket has one son.

Political career 

“Perestroika” epoch and the worsening of in the end of 1980s of the Qarabagh problem greatly influenced the forming of her social and political activity. It became the basis for the cooperation with the prominent leaders of Soviet Union's democratic movement.

The “Bloody January” events of 1990 became a sort of a detonator of the flight of her political career. The whole world became the witness of the barbarian military demarche of the Soviet Army against the peaceful population of Baku because of the press-conference, called by Shevket at the permanent representation of Azerbaijan in Moscow on 20th and 21 January. It was the time, when the republic was taken in a ring of information blockade...  The correspondent of an American information agency NBC called this press conference "The historical moment in the process of increasing the self-consciousness of Azerbaijan people."

In 1991 alongside Eduard Shevardnadze, Alexander Yakovlev, Sobchak, Popov, Brazauscas and other democrats Shevket was one of the founders of the Movement for Democratic Reforms in the USSR. The same year she founded the International socio-political movement "For Democratic Reforms in Azerbaijan Republic and Protection of Human Rights", which became the first international political organization of a national republic of the union officially recognized by the Soviet government. Representations of this organization were founded in Azerbaijan as well as other Soviet republics and countries of Western Europe.

In June 1993, Shevket was invited to Baku by the acting President H. Aliyev and on 7 June was appointed the Secretary of State of Azerbaijan Republic.

In January 1994, Shevket wrote a resignation letter as a protest against corruption in the government. This has become a precedent in Azerbaijan of voluntary resignation from such a high position because of one's morality principles.

In January 1993, Shevket was made Extraordinary and Plenipotentiary Ambassador thus making her the first woman ambassador in the history of Azerbaijan. Despite further appointment of her as ambassador to the UN she, creating a precedent in the world practice, for 8 months refused to go to New York since she could not represent the policies that are not acceptable to her.

In 1995, Shevket created the Liberal Party of Azerbaijan and was elected as its leader on the Constituent Conference, which took place on 3 June 1995. Thus, she became the fonder of liberal ideology in modern Azerbaijan. The first book on theory of liberalism in Azeri language was published under her guidance.

In 1998 Shevket has been one of the five potential presidential candidates, who boycotted the Elections.

On 7 June 2003 in the Liberal Party Congress Shevket resigned from the party in order to start her presidential campaign as an independent candidate. Thus, she has laid another cornerstone into the political tradition of Azerbaijan.

As leader of the National Unity Movement and the Liberal Party of Azerbaijan, Shevket participated in the 2005 Parliamentary Election at the head of the list of 70 Liberal Party candidates. Shevket won a decisive victory in her constituency, which was officially recognised by the Central Election Commission. As the result of total falsification, however, the victory of at least 11 Liberal Party candidates was not officially recognized. The Central Election Commission and the courts either did not examine their complaints or groundlessly rejected them. At the same time, the authorities also denied the victory of approximately 50 candidates from Liberal Party's ally - the “Azadliq” Bloc. When starting her campaign Lala Shevket said: "I am not fighting for a parliamentary seat, but for my nation". 

On 17 February 2006 the "Azadliq" Political Bloc was created. The Bloc consisted of three major oppositional political parties – the Azerbaijan Liberal Party, the Popular Front Party and the Citizens and Development Party. During its existence the Bloc has proved itself in the vanguard of the opposition's struggle for democracy and human rights in Azerbaijan.

In 2008 Shevket together with other opposition leaders has boycotted the presidential election due to complete lack of freedom and openness in the country, lack of even the minimal requirements for the election to be free and fair.

In 2010 before the parliamentary elections "Azadliq" Political Bloc has been disbanded due to the decision of the Popular Front Party to join a coalition with the Musavat Party. Azerbaijan Liberal Party has participated in the parliamentary elections together with its ally from the disbanded "Azadliq" Bloc the Citizens and Development Party, as well as the Green Party and the Movement of Intelligentsia, forming the Election Bloc "For Human". The elections, however, have been totally falsified and not a single member of the opposition has been allowed to enter the Parliament.

Shevket is the leader of Azerbaijan Liberal Party and its candidate for presidency.

References 

This article has been written based on the information taken from Shevket's official website. The information included in the site is licensed under the GNU Free Documentation License, used with permission.

External links 
 Official website of Lala Shevket

1951 births
Living people
Politicians from Baku
Azerbaijan Liberal Party politicians
Government ministers of Azerbaijan
Women government ministers of Azerbaijan
20th-century Azerbaijani women politicians
20th-century Azerbaijani politicians
21st-century Azerbaijani women politicians
21st-century Azerbaijani politicians